The Book Tower is a , 38-story skyscraper located at 1265 Washington Boulevard in Downtown Detroit, Michigan, within the Washington Boulevard Historic District. Construction began on the Italian Renaissance-style building in 1916, as an addition to the original Book Building, and finished a decade later. Designed in the Academic Classicism style, it has 38 rentable floors, two basement levels and two mechanical floors. 

It has a green copper roof, a roofing style shared by the nearby Westin Book Cadillac Hotel. Retail and gallery floors used to reside on the first and second floors, with businesses previously occupying the rest. The building is currently unoccupied but is under renovation by Bedrock Real Estate Services and is planned to open again.

History

Named after the famous Book Brothers of Detroit, it was briefly the tallest building in the city from 1926 until the completion of the Penobscot Building in 1928. A taller Book Tower of 81 stories was to be built at the opposite end of the Book Building, but the Great Depression cancelled those plans. The building contains a cartouche by the Detroit architectural sculptor Corrado Parducci.

From its opening through the mid-1970s, the Book Tower remained a prestigious address on Washington Boulevard. Like many structures in the city, its fortunes declined until 1988 when the owners defaulted on the mortgage. In 1989, Travelers Insurance, the principal mortgage-holder, took possession and sold the building to developer John Lambrecht, who had previously purchased and renovated the Cadillac Tower a few blocks east. Lambrecht had similar plans for the Book Building and Tower. His untimely death later that year brought things to a halt.

Lambrecht's widow attempted to manage the property and made some improvements, but she was unable to maintain momentum. In July 2006, she sold the Book Tower to the Pagan Organization, a New York-based investment group. Pagan's plans were for a renovation and conversion of both the Book Tower and Book building into a mix of retail, residential, and office units. The Pagan Organization created the Northeast Commercial Services Corp. to manage the building. Northeast Commercial Services Corp. filed for Chapter 11 protection in May 2007, after defaulting on its mortgage loan. The last tenant, Bookie's Tavern, closed in January 2009, and moved to a new location downtown, leaving the entire building vacant.

In November 2009, Key Investment Group of Clinton Township, Michigan announced intentions to buy and renovate the building as a mixed-use development with high rise residential units, office space, and retail. Weeks earlier, the investors revealed that they were looking to purchase the building from AKNO Enterprises of Vancouver for a green renovation. In January 2010, Rosemarie Dobek, CFO of Key Investment Group, reported that the group was pursuing plans for a US$320 million green renovation to include the Book Tower and four other Detroit buildings.

In August 2013, Book Tower owner ANKO Enterprises of Vancouver, British Columbia, filed a tax abatement for a future renovation of the building. Specific plans were not disclosed.

In August 2015, Bedrock Real Estate, owned by Dan Gilbert, announced it would purchase the Book complex, including the Book Tower. The purchase price was reported to be about $30 million. Since that time, work has been on-going to renovate and restore the building into mixed-use retail, commercial and residential. Public tours were given in 2019 showing the progress of the project. The renovation project is expected to be complete sometime in 2022.

Gallery

See also
List of tallest buildings in Detroit

References

Further reading

Kvaran, Einar Einarsson, Architectural Sculpture of America, unpublished manuscript

External links
Historic Detroit — Book Tower
Green Renovation Article

Skyscraper office buildings in Detroit
Unused buildings in Detroit
Historic district contributing properties in Michigan
National Register of Historic Places in Detroit
Buildings with sculpture by Corrado Parducci
Office buildings completed in 1926
1926 establishments in Michigan
Neoclassical architecture in Michigan
Renaissance Revival architecture in Michigan
Rock Ventures
Louis Kamper buildings